Presidential elections were held in Turkmenistan on 12 February 2012. They were Turkmenistan's fourth presidential elections and decided who would be the country's president for the next five years. Gurbanguly Berdimuhamedow won with 97% of the vote.

Candidates

Official
 Gurbanguly Berdimuhamedow, incumbent President of Turkmenistan
 Rejep Bazarow, deputy head of the Daşoguz Province
 Kakageldi Abdullaýew, Governor of the Türkmenbaşy District
 Gurbanmämmet Mollaniýazow, manager of Türkmennebit
 Annageldi Orazberdiýewiç Ýazmyradow, Water Minister
 Esendurdy Gaýypow, head of Lebapgurluşyk production association
 Saparmyrat Batyrow, director of the Gökdepe textile mill
 Ýarmuhammet Orazgulyýew, Deputy Energy and Industry Minister 

All of them are members of Turkmenistan's only political party, the Democratic Party of Turkmenistan.

Declared interest

 Nurmuhammet Hanamow, leader of the exiled Republican Party of Turkmenistan

Denied

 Aina Abayeva, English teacher nominated by the Civil Society Movement. Her request to participate was rejected because the organisation that nominated her was an unregistered NGO. Its lack of legal status meant that it did not have the authority to make such a nomination.

Campaign
Campaigning started in October 2011. During the campaign many of the candidates running against the incumbent president expressed their support for him, thus giving rise to suspicions that his victory was more or less guaranteed. According to an expert from the Chatham House, "the vote [was] a democratic sham" and an example of "faux democracy".

Results

References

Turkmenistan
Presidential election
Presidential elections in Turkmenistan
Election and referendum articles with incomplete results